Brian Payton is an American writer of fiction and nonfiction.

Born in Los Angeles County in 1966, Payton lived in California, Illinois, Texas, New Mexico, and Alaska before settling in British Columbia at the age of 16. He was educated at the Seminary of Christ the King and the University of Victoria.

Payton's first novel, Hail Mary Corner (Beach Holme), is a coming-of-age tale based on his experience living among fellow seminarians and Benedictine monks. His nonfiction writing about adventure, wildlife, and the environment has appeared in The New York Times, the Los Angeles Times, the Chicago Tribune, The Boston Globe, Canadian Geographic,.

Shadow of the Bear: Travels in Vanishing Wilderness is a work of narrative nonfiction, which chronicles a personal search for the eight remaining bear species across continents, cultures, and memory.

Payton's book The Ice Passage: A True Story of Ambition, Disaster, and Endurance in the Arctic Wilderness (Doubleday Canada), is a narrative nonfiction account of the final voyage of HMS Investigator.

His latest book, a novel, The Wind is Not a River is set in Alaska during the Japanese invasion of the Aleutian Islands of Attu and Kiska. The New York Times, in a review posted on January 31, 2014,  called the book "gripping" and "meditative."

Payton lives with his wife in Vancouver.

Bibliography

Fiction

Hail Mary Corner (2001)

Nonfiction

 The Ice Passage: A True Story of Ambition, Disaster, and Endurance in the Arctic Wilderness (2009)
 Shadow of the Bear: Travels in Vanishing Wilderness (2006)
 Literary Trips: Following in the Footsteps of Fame, Vol. 2] (anthology, 2001)

References

External links
 Brian Payton's homepage
 Articles by Brian Payton in The Walrus

21st-century American novelists
American male novelists
American nature writers
Writers from California
1966 births
Living people
21st-century American male writers
21st-century American non-fiction writers
American male non-fiction writers